Malus spontanea, the nokaidō, is a species of crabapple in the family Rosaceae, found only in the Ebino-kōgen high plateau of the Kirishima volcanic complex of Kyushu, Japan. It is closely related to Malus halliana, currently found in the wild in China, and considered possibly originally native to Japan. Fewer than 300 individuals survive in the wild.

References

spontanea
Crabapples
Endemic flora of Japan
Plants described in 1914